Matthew Gunn (born April 22, 1972) is an American writer and actor from St. Louis, Missouri.

Early life
Gunn has four brothers — filmmaker James, actor Sean, screenwriter Brian, producer and former Executive Vice President of Artisan Entertainment Patrick — and a sister, Beth.

 He and his brothers all attended the Jesuit St. Louis University High School, where he graduated in 1990. Their parents are Leota and James F. Gunn, who is a retired partner and corporate attorney with the law firm Thompson Coburn in St. Louis.

Writing
In 1997, he wrote, produced, and starred in Man About Town, a 22-minute film that won the Sundance Film Festival's Short Filmmaking Award. Gunn is a political and humor writer on HBO's Real Time with Bill Maher, for which he won a Writers Guild of America Award for Outstanding Comedy/Variety Talk Series and was nominated for an Emmy five times. Gunn played "Dan McMahon" in the 2003 film, The Man Who Invented the Moon.

References

Further reading
 Mary Delach Leonard. "Gunns Hit Their Target in Hollywood", St Louis Post-Dispatch. March 23, 2003. page E1.

External links

American male film actors
American male screenwriters
Living people
Male actors from St. Louis
1972 births
Screenwriters from Missouri